Nico Vega was an American indie rock band formed in 2005 in Los Angeles, California, United States. They consist of lead vocalist Aja Volkman, lead guitarist Rich Koehler, and drummer Dan Epand.

The group has released two albums Nico Vega (2009) and Lead to Light (2014). Billboard described Lead to Light as possessing "some of the most unstoppable pop-rock hooks heard all year." After a hiatus announced on June 6, 2016, the band returned nearly two years later on April 6, 2018, when Volkman announced a new single and a return on her Instagram.

In 2020, Volkman and Epand formed a new duo called TWWO and released their debut EP "Pull the Knife Out".

History
Aja Volkman started writing songs while in high school in Eugene, Oregon.  Later she moved to Los Angeles and started performing on her own.  She had hoped to eventually form a band.  That happened when one night after a show in 2005, Mike Peña approached her about singing with him and Rich Koehler.  The band called themselves Nico Vega after Mike's mother.  However, in 2007 Mike left the band to pursue acting and enjoy fatherhood.  At that point, Dan Epand joined the band as their new drummer and has been a driving force behind their continued creativity.

Nico Vega have garnered a reputation as an exciting live band, touring with Gavin Rossdale (of Bush) (2009), Neon Trees (2009, 2012), Manic Street Preachers (2009-2010), Metric (2010), She Wants Revenge (2011), Blondie (2011), and Imagine Dragons (2010, 2013, 2014) among others.  They have also opened for No Doubt and KISS.

Nico Vega (2009)
Nico Vega released several independent EPs and recorded their own videos to get their music out.  In 2009, Nico Vega released their first full-length album via MySpace Records.  The album was co-produced by Tim Edgar, a friend of the band, and Linda Perry (Pink, Gwen Stefani, Christina Aguilera).  Linda produced three songs for the album: "So So Fresh", "Wooden Dolls" and "Gravity".  The album was mixed by Tchad Blake (The Black Keys, Sheryl Crow).  In 2013, Nico Vega released the Fury Oh Fury EP and re-released single "Beast", which garnered national popularity when it featured in the video game BioShock Infinite, resulting in more than 5 million streams and downloads.  Drummer Dan Epand also features on the recent project of Andy Summers (of The Police), Circa Zero.

Lead to Light (2014)
Second album Lead to Light was released via Five Seven Music on July 22, 2014.  The album was co-produced by Dan Reynolds (Imagine Dragons), Tony Hoffer (Beck, Fitz and the Tantrums, M83) and Tim Edgar (Nico Vega). Single "I Believe (Get Over Yourself)" was co-written by Dan Reynolds (of Imagine Dragons).  Nico Vega performed "I Believe (Get Over Yourself)" on VH1's Big Morning Buzz Live., and was featured in the trailer for season four of the American Television show Girls. Track "Lightning" were co-written with members of She Wants Revenge. NPR premiered track "I'm On Fire" via All Songs Considered and offered it as a free download. USA Today premiered track "No Home".

Nico Vega performed at Life Is Beautiful Festival (2013), The Great Escape Festival (2014), and Reading and Leeds Festivals (2014).

Indefinite hiatus 
On June 6, 2016, Aja Volkman announced in a post on the band's official Facebook page, that Nico Vega was taking an indefinite hiatus. Aja went on to apologize to fans for not staying in better communication, while also thanking fans for their continued support over the years. In regard to if this meant the band was breaking up, Aja said, "I can't say that it's over forever, because nobody knows the future. But it is over for now."

On April 5, 2018, Volkman returned to Instagram to announce the return of the band and a new single, "Little Operator", which was released the following day. This was followed up by the 5-song "Wars" EP, released September 14, 2018.

Break-up 
In June 2020, Nico Vega has broken up, as Aja Volkman and Dan Epand have formed a new band called, “TWWO".

Members
Final lineup
Aja Volkman – lead vocals (2005–2016, 2018–2020)
Rich Koehler – lead guitar (2005–2016, 2018–2020)
Dan Epand – drums (2007–2016, 2018–2020)

Other members
 Michael Peña –  drums (2005–2007)
Jamila Weaver – bass (2012–2013)

Discography

Studio albums
 Nico Vega (2009)
 Lead to Light (2014) Heatseekers #9

EPs
 Chooseyourwordspoorly (2006)
 Cocaine Cooked the Brain (2007)
 No Child Left Behind (2007)
 Nico Vega Covers Nico Vega and Rod Stewart (2011)
 Fury Oh Fury (2013) Heatseekers #17
Wars (2018)

Singles
"Beast" (2009, re-released on 2013 as an official single & as a "Vicetone v. Nico Vega remix" through Monstercat)
"Bang Bang (My Baby Shot Me Down)" (2013)
"I Believe (Get Over Yourself)" (2014)
"Perfect Day" (2015)
"Little Operator" (2018)

Videography

References

Alternative rock groups from California
Musical groups established in 2005
Musical groups from Los Angeles
2005 establishments in California